Chashan is a Burmish language spoken in Pianma Township (片马镇), Lushui County, Yunnan, China, in Xiapianma (下片马), Gangfang (岗房), and Gulang (古浪) villages. It is closely related to Lashi, and has 56.3% lexical similarity with Lashi of Lushui County out of a sample of 1,000 vocabulary words.

In Pianma Township, there are 587 Chashan people officially classified as ethnic Lisu. The local people consider the Chashan to be a distinct ethnic group, separate from the Jingpo people. More Chashan speakers may be found across the border in Kachin State, Myanmar.

References

Further reading 

 

Burmish languages
Languages of China